Michael C. Williams (born July 25, 1973) is an American actor, best known for his role (using his own name) in the movie The Blair Witch Project. Williams also acted in the television program Law & Order during February 2000 as a man whose ex-wife killed their son. In 2008 Williams appeared in the movie The Objective.

Williams was born in The Bronx, New York, and attended Westlake High School in Thornwood, New York. He graduated from SUNY New Paltz.  He is also a national member of Kappa Sigma Fraternity of New Paltz.

Williams is the manager of the Big Blue Door Theater, based in Hawthorne, New York. In 2009, it was reported that he was studying to become a guidance counselor. Williams now works as a guidance counselor in addition to running acting classes and directing school plays in Westchester, New York.

References

External links

American male film actors
People from the Bronx
State University of New York at New Paltz alumni
1973 births
Living people
Male actors from New York (state)
People from Hawthorne, New York